Asunción Cacalotepec  is a town and municipality in Oaxaca, Mexico. It is part of the Sierra Mixe district within the Sierra Norte de Oaxaca Region. As of 2005, the municipality had a total population of 753.

References

Municipalities of Oaxaca